The 1981 Western Illinois Leathernecks football team represented Western Illinois University as a member of the Association of Mid-Continent Universities during the 1981 NCAA Division I-AA football season. They were led by third-year head coach Pete Rodriguez and played their home games at Hanson Field.

Schedule

References

Western Illinois
Western Illinois Leathernecks football seasons
Western Illinois Leathernecks football
Association of Mid-Continent Universities football champion seasons